This is a partial list of films that won awards at the Sidewalk Film Festival.


2007
9th Annual Sidewalk Film Festival: September 22 - September 24

Narrative Features
 Best narrative Feature - Low and Behold
 Best Director - Low and Behold
 Best First Feature - August the First
 Original Vision - Last Stop for Paul
 Filmmaker to Watch - Murder Party

Documentaries
 Best Documentary Feature - Darius Goes West: The Roll of His Life
 Best Short Documentary - Salim Baba
 Best Student Documentary - A Street Divided
 Special Jury Award - Join Us

Short Films
 Best Short Film - Pop Foul
 Best Animated Film - Everything Will be OK
 Best Student Film, 1st Place - Caress of the Creature; 2nd Place - Heartburn
 Best Alabama Short Film - I'm Nostalgic
 Kathryn Tucker Windham Storytelling Award - A Death in the Woods
 Special Jury Award for Direction - Archer House
 Special Jury Award for Brilliance in Imagery - Help is Coming
 Special Jury Award for Brilliance in Animation - Their Circumstances
 Alabama Citations of Excellence (ACE) Awards
 Excellence in Storytelling - Asclepius Fandango
 Excellence in Imagery - Modern Plays: The Music Video
 Excellence in Directing - Cup of Joe
 Excellence in Originality - Lunch with Lincoln
 Excellence in Comedy - Lunch
 Excellence in Comedy Writing - The Little Things
 Excellence in Acting - Tallie Medel, in I'm Nostalgic
 Excellence in Documentary Filmmaking: Dick-George, Tenn-Tom and Speaking Without Speaking
Audience Choice
 Best Narrative Feature - American Fork
 Best Documentary Feature - Darius Goes West: The Roll of his Life
 Best Short Film - Deface
 Best Alabama Film - Overflow

Other Awards
 SideWrite, Grand Prize - "Self-Addressed" by James Pihakis
 SideWrite, Second Prize - "Stuck" by Susan C. McCain
 SideWrite, Production Prize - "Face Value" by Julie Pritt

2008
10th Annual Sidewalk Film Festival: September 26 - September 28

Narrative Features
 Best Narrative Feature - Cook County
 Best Director – Barry Jenkins, for Medicine for Melancholy

Documentaries
 Best Documentary Feature - Intimidad
 Best Short Documentary - Young Arabs
 Special Jury Award, Feature Documentary - We are Wizards
 Special Jury Award, Short Documentary -  Silly & Serious: William Robinson and Self Portraits
 Reel Green Award - Flow: For the Love of Water
 Special Reel Green Jury Award - eDump

Short Films
 Best Short Film - The Adventure
 Best Animated Film - Starsearchers
 Best Student Film - Viola: The Traveling Rooms of a Little Giant
 Best Alabama Short Film - Trust
 Kathryn Tucker Windham Storytelling Award - Hirsute
 Special Jury Award for Outstanding Film making - Glory at Sea
 Alabama Citation of Excellence Awards (ACE Awards)
 Special Jury Award - 20th Century Reliance
 Excellence in Documenting Educational Disparity - Fine Lines and Foundation of Success
 For Silently Celebrating the Spirit of the South - Donkey Fountain
 For Courage in Exploration of Unconventional Love - Palster
 Best Catchphrase - One Bad Bastard
Audience Choice
 Best Narrative Feature - Coyote
 Best Documentary Feature - Dear Zachary: A Letter to a Son About His Father
 Best Short Film - Sebastian's Voodoo
 Best Alabama Film - Skiptracers

Other Awards
 SideWrite, Grand Prize - "A Good Man" by Stacey Davis
 SideWrite, Production Prize - "Love in the Grocery Store" by Tam Le
 Sidewalk Chalk: Curing Childhood Cancer, Winner - Out-Touching Cancer by Margaret Broach & Kristen Ryan

2009
11th Annual Sidewalk Film Festival: September 25 - September 27

Narrative Features
 Best Narrative Feature Film - The House of the Devil by Ti West
 Grand Prix Award - Modern Love is Automatic by Zach Clark
 Best Director - Scott Teems, for That Evening Sun
 Best Performance - Adam Scott, in The Vicious Kind
 Mise en Scene Award - David Lowery, St. Nick
 Clint Howard Character Actor Award - Clint Howard, in Alabama Moon

Documentary Features
 Best Documentary Feature Film - Best Worst Movie by Michael Paul Stephenson
 Special Jury Award for Artistic Portrait - Luckey by Laura Longsworth
 Special Jury Award for Artistic Vision - 45265 by Bill Ross & Turner Ross

Shorts
 Best Short Film - I Am So Proud of You by Don Hertzfeld
 Best Animated Film - Dahlia by Michael Langan
 Best Alabama Short - Hallelujah! Gorilla Revival, by Jason LaRay & Jeremiah Ledbetter
 Special Jury Prize - Feeder, by Joseph Ernst
 Best Student Film - Token Hunchback, by Tim Reckart
 Kathryn Tucker Windham Storytelling Award - Hallelujah! Gorilla Revival, by Jason LaRay & Jeremiah Ledbetter

Audience Choice Awards
 Best Narrative Feature - Alabama Moon by Tim McCanlies
 Best Documentary Feature - Best Worst Movie by Michael Paul Stephenson
 Best Short Film - Some of What I Know About Tommy By Chris Hilleke
 Best Alabama Film - Interplanetary by Chance Shirley

Alabama Awards
 Alabama Citation of Excellence Award (ACE Award) - Cerebella by Adam Windgard & Alex Justinger
 Scramble, Best in Show - Natural Selection by Team Blue Mug
 SideWrite, Production Prize Winner - "The Burden", by Bill Barnett
 SideWrite, "Lost in Transmission", by Carl Edward Orr

2010
12th Annual Sidewalk Film Festival: September 24 - September 26

Jury Awards
 Best Feature: Narrative - Audrey the Trainwreck
 Best Feature: Documentary - Beijing Taxi
 Best Short: Narrative - Conlang
 Best Short: Documentary - Seltzer Works
 Best Animated Film - The Bellows March
 Best Alabama Film - Perry County
 Clint Howard Character Actor Award - Wendell Pearce, in Night Catches Us
 Kathryn Tucker Windham Award for Storytelling - Daud
 Special Prize for Direction - Will Canon, for Brotherhood
 Special Jury Prize - The Thing About Being an Assassin

Audience Choice Awards
 Best Feature: Narrative - Brotherhood
 Best Feature: Documentary - Ready, Set, Bag!
 Best Short: Narrative - Lucy in LaLa
 Best Short: Documentary - Torch
 Best Alabama Film - Lifted

Other Awards
 Sidewalk Programmers Award - Barbershop Punk and Gabi on the Roof in July (tie)
 Best Teen Film - Planting Season

2011
13th Annual Sidewalk Film Festival: August 26 - August 28 

Jury Awards
 Best Feature: Narrative - Without, Dir: Mark Jackson
 Best Feature: Documentary - Guilty Pleasures, Dir: Julie Moggan
 Best Short: Narrative - Terrebonne, Dir: Jeremy Craig
 Best Short: Documentary - Mr. Happy Man, Dir: Matt Morris
 Best Animated Film - Bike Race, Dir: Tom Schroeder
 Best Alabama Film - The Chief, Dir: Christopher Scott and Mary Baschab
 Clint Howard Character Actor Award - Sean Nelson, in Treatment
 Special Breakout Performance Award - Nate Rubin, in Wuss
 Kathryn Tucker Windham Award for Storytelling - Two-Legged Rat Bastards, Dir: Scott Weintrob
 Best Student Film - An Inconvenient Youth, Dir: Slater Jewell-Kemker

Audience Choice Awards
 Best Feature: Narrative - A Bag of Hammers, Dir: Brian Crano
 Best Feature: Documentary - Man in the Glass: The Dale Brown Story, Dir: Patrick Sheehan
 Best Short: Narrative - Annie and Her Anger, Dir: Tam Le
 Best Short: Documentary - The Dancer, Dir: Seth Stark
 Best Alabama Film - The Man in the Glass: The Dale Brown Story, Dir Patrick Sheehan

Other Awards
 Sidewalk Programmers Award - Small Pond, Dir: Josh Slates

2012
14th Annual Sidewalk Film Festival: August 26 - August 28 

Jury Awards
 Best Feature: Narrative - Kid Thing, Dir: David Zellner
 Best Feature: Documentary - American Man, Dir: Jon Frankel
 Best Short: Narrative - DeafBlind, Dir: Ewan Bailey
 Best Short: Documentary - Brute Force, Dir: Ben Steinbauer
 Best Alabama Film - Eating Alabama, Dir: Andrew Beck Grace
 Best Alabama Short - "Grand Fugue on the Art of Gumbo", Dir: Gideon Kennedy and Isabel Machado
 Kathryn Tucker Windham Award for Storytelling - Julie On Her Way, Dir: Tam Le
 Best Student Film - "Undocumented", Dir: Carlos Estrada

Audience Choice Awards
 Best Feature: Narrative - Wolf, Dir: Ya'Kee Smith
 Best Feature: Documentary - G.L.O.W, Dir: Brett Whitcomb
 Best Short: Narrative - The Wheel, Dir: John Roberts
 Best Short: Documentary - Cardboard Titantics: Smart People Being Stupid, Dir: Sam Frazier
 Best Alabama Film - American Man, Dir: John Frankel

2013
15th Annual Sidewalk Film Festival: August 23–25, 2013

Documentary:

Best Documentary Feature: HIT & STAY
 Special Mention by Doc Jury:
 REMOTE AREA MEDICAL
 TEENAGE for Creative Editing Process!
Shout:
 The Most Fun I’ve Had With My Pants On (Special Cinematography Award)
 Straight and Narrow (Short)
 Remote Area (Life & Liberty)
 Ink Deep (Best Short)
 Continental (Best Feature)
Narrative:
 Clint Howard Character Actor Award: Louisa Krause, BLUEBIRD
 Special Jury Prize for Best Director: Destin Daniel Cretton, SHORT TERM 12
 Jambor-Franklin Founder's Award for Best Narrative: SEE YOU NEXT TUESDAY
Shorts:
 Best Narrative Short: S/ASH
 Best Short Doc: World Fair
 Best Student Film: Unsettlement
 Alan Hunter Best Alabama Film :Tasia and the Cheese Revolution
 Kathryn Tucker Windham Award: The Casaba River
Special Awards:
 Visionary Award: Showstopper
 Lil’ Bub award for cuteness: B-Boy
Schaeffer Eye Center Audience Choice Awards:
 Narrative Feature: Short Term 12
 Doc Feature: Good Old Freda
 Best Narrative Short: Stakes
 Best Doc Short: How to Sharpen Pencils
 Best Alabama Film: Eye on the Sixties
Shout Audience Choice:
 Narrative feature: Southern Baptist Sissies
 Doc Feature: Continental
 Short: Ink Deep

2014
16th Annual Sidewalk Film Festival: August 22–24, 2014

Sidewalk Jury Awards
Jambor-Franklin Founder's Award for Best Narrative Feature: L for Leisure
Best Narrative Short: The Chaperone
Best Documentary Feature: The Hand That Feeds
Best Documentary Short: Cherry Pop: The Story of the World's Fanciest Cat
Alan Hunter Best Alabama Film: Limo Ride
Best Student Film: Skunk
Best SHOUT Film: An Honest Liar Honorable mentions: Dyke Central: Taboo and The Night is Ours
Kathryn Tucker Windham Storytelling Award: Yearbook
Clint Howard Character Actor Award: Cindy Silver, Uncertain Terms
Special Jury Award for Visionary Storytelling: Bob Birdnow's Remarkable Tale of Human Survival and the Transcendence of Self
Special Jury Award for Creative Spirit in Documentary Filmmaking: Living Stars
SIDEWRITE Best Alabama Screenplay: Alan Moore, The Fishing Trip
Sidewalk Audience Choice Awards
Best Narrative Feature: It Is What It Is
Best Documentary Feature: No No: A Dockumentary
Best Narrative Short: The Gunfighter
Best Documentary Short: The Next Part
Best Alabama Film: Skanks
Best SHOUT Film: South Beach on Heels

2015
Feature Films:

Jambor-Franklin Founder's Award for Best Narrative: Trey Edward Shults, KRISHA

Special Jury Prize: Alexandria Bombach & Mo Scarpelli, FRAME BY FRAME

Special Jury Prize for Audacious Vision: Rania Attieh & Daniel Garcia, H.

Best Documentary Feature: Zackary Canepari & Drea Cooper, T-REX

Honorable Mention: Steve Hoover, CROCODILE GENNADIY

Programmers’ Award: David Burkman, HAZE

Clint Howard Character Actor Award: Eleanore Pienta, 7 CHINESE BROTHERS

Alan Hunter Best Alabama Award: Bradford Thomason & Brett Whitcomb, COUNTY FAIR, TEXAS

Short Films:

Best Narrative Short: Minji Kang, “The Loyalist”

Best Short Documentary: Nicolas Coles, “The House Is Innocent”

Best Student Film: Kelsey Harrison, “Coming and Going”

Kathryn Tucker Windham Award: Paul D. Hart, “Three Fingers”

SHOUT:

Best SHOUT Feature: Stephen Cone, HENRY GAMBLE’S BIRTHDAY PARTY

SHOUT Programmers’ Award: Marq Evans, THE GLAMOUR & THE SQUALOR

Best SHOUT Short: Jeremy Asher Lynch, Tomgirl

Schaeffer Eye Center Audience Choice Awards:

Narrative Feature: For a Few Zombies More

Documentary Feature: Revival: The Sam Bush Story

Best Narrative Short: One Night in Aberdeen

Best Documentary Short: Stumped

Best Alabama Film: Revival: The Sam Bush Story

SHOUT Audience Choice:

Narrative Feature: Henry Gamble's Birthday Party

Documentary Feature: The State of Being Human

Short: “Elder”

2016

Jury Awards 

Jambor-Franklin Founders Award for Best Narrative Feature: "Donald Cried"

Best Documentary Feature: ''Syl Johnson: Any Way the Wind Blows." Honorable Mention: "Jackson."

Alan Hunter Best Alabama Film: ''Gip''

Best Narrative Short: "A Film by Vera Vaughn''

Best Documentary Short: ''Frame 394"

Best Student Film: ''The Mink Catcher"

Special Jury Award, Short: "The Champion" and "A House Without Snakes"

Sidewalk Programmers Award: "The Master Cleanse" Honorable mention: "Cheerleader"

Sidewalk Programmers Shorts Award: "The Quantified Self"

Kathryn Tucker Windham Storytelling Award: ''Pickle''

Clint Howard Character Actor Award: Celia Rowlson-Hall, "MA"

Jury Award Honorable Mention for Narrative Filmmaking: "Red Folder"

Jury Award Honorable Mention: "First Lady of the Revolution"

Best Family/Kids Film: "Kedi"

Honorable Mention for Comedy: "Nigel & Oscar vs. Sasquatch"

Honorable Mention for Imagination: "Monty and the Runaway Furnace"

Best SHOUT Feature: ''Teenage Cocktail"

Best SHOUT Documentary: ''Kiki"

Best SHOUT Short: ''Sign"

SHOUT Programmers Award: "Slash." Honorable mention: "MA."

SHOUT Special Mention: Clare Cooney in "Bird of Prey"

SHOUT Special Mention: "Ending the Silence," Best LGBTQ Alabama Film

Audience Choice 

Best Narrative Feature: "Service to Man''

Best Documentary Feature: "Gip"

Best Narrative Short: "Madame Black"

Best Documentary Short: "Pickle"

Best Alabama Film: "First Lady of the Revolution"

Best SHOUT Narrative Feature: "Miles"

Best SHOUT Documentary Feature: "Suited"

Best SHOUT Short: "The Escape Hatch''

2017

Jury Awards 

The following awards are presented by the competition juries of Sidewalk & SHOUT.

Jambor-Franklin Founders Award For Best Narrative Feature ($1000) — Are We Not Cats directed by Xander Robin

Best Narrative Short ($500) — “August” directed by Caitlyn Greene

Best Documentary Feature ($1000) — The New Radical directed by Adam Bhala Lough

Best Documentary Short sponsored By Baker Donelson ($500) — “All the Leaves Are Brown” directed by Daniel Robin

Best Animated Short Film ($250) — “Second to None” directed by Vincent Gallagher

Alan Hunter Award For Best Alabama Film ($500) — “Gardens of Red Dust” directed by Corey Carpenter and Maggie Patterson

Kathryn Tucker Windham Storytelling Award sponsored By The Family Of Kathryn Tucker Windham ($1000) — “Mutt” directed by Erin Sanger

Best Student Film sponsored By Media And Film Studies At Birmingham-Southern College ($250) — “Fry Day” directed by Laura Moss

Family Film Award — Into the Who Knows directed by Micah Barber

Best Life & Liberty Film sponsored By Jones & Hawley Law ($250) — Most Beautiful Island directed by Ana Asensio

Best SHOUT LGBTQ Film sponsored By The LGBTQ Fund ($500) — Alabama Bound directed by Lara Embry and Carolyn Sherer

Spirit Of Sidewalk Award — The General and Dan Koch of Splash Adventure

Features Programmers Award ($500) — Blame directed by Quinn Shephard

Shorts Programmers Award ($250) — “Shilo” directed by Tyler Russell

Best Crowdfunded Film Award sponsored By Seed&Spark — “Olde E” directed by Xavier Neal-Burgin

Audience Awards 

The following awards are audience choice. Sponsored by Educ.

Best Narrative Feature ($250) — Dr. Brinks & Dr. Brinks directed by Josh Crockett

Best Documentary Feature sponsored By Urban Cookhouse ($250) — Charged: The Eduardo Garcia Story directed by Phillip Baribeau

Best Narrative Short sponsored By Alabama Professional Services ($150) — “Just, Go” directed by Pavel Gumennikov

Best Documentary Short ($150) — TIE: “First to Go: Story of the Katakoa Family” directed by Myles Matsuno and “A Good Blinder” by Mike Grundmann and Shaun Wright

Best Alabama Film sponsored By Forge ($250) — Alabama Bound directed by Lara Embry and Carolyn Sherer

Best SHOUT LGBTQ Film ($250) — Princess Cyd directed by Stephen Cone

2018

Jury Awards 
Awards presented by the competition juries of Sidewalk & Shout

Jambor-Franklin Founders Award for Best Narrative Feature ($1000) --"Thunder Road" directed by Jim Cummings

Best Documentary Feature ($1000) --"America" directed by Erick Stoll

Best Narrative Short ($500) --"Debris" directed by Julio Ramos

Best Documentary Short ($500) --"The Driver is Red" directed by Randall Christopher

Best Animated Short ($250) --"Funeral" directed by Leah Shore

Kathryn Tucker Windham Storytelling Award ($1000) --"Bad Things" directed by Mira K Lippold-Johnson

Alan Hunter Best Alabama Film ($500) --"Wrestle" directed by Suzannah Herbert and Lauren Belfer

Best SHOUT Feature Film ($500) --"Call Her Ganda" directed by PJ Raval

Best SHOUT Short Film ($250) --"Poison" directed by Erica Eng

Best Family Film --"Science Fair" directed by Christina Constantini and Darren Foster

Best Student Film ($250) --"Native" directed by Isaiah Woods

Reel South Short Film Award ($500) --"Second Assault" directed by Jullian Corsie and Amy Rosner

Sidewrite Best Feature Length Script ($500) --"Indian Country" written by Troy Kelly

Sidewrite Best Short Script ($250) --"Cherry Glazed" written by Christine Sherwood

Sidewrite Best Alabama Script ($250) --"June Block Hero" written by Seth Kozak

Audience Awards 
Best Narrative Feature ($250) --"Mapplethorpe" directed by Ondi Timoner

Best Documentary Feature ($250) --Bathtubs over Broadway" directed by Dava Whisenat

Best Narrative Short ($150) --"Undiscovered" directed by Sara Litzenberger

Best Documentary Short ($150) --"Come and Take It" directed by Ellen Spiro and PJ Raval

Best Alabama Film ($250) --"Icepick to the Moon" directed by Skizz Cyzyk

Best SHOUT Film ($250) --"Wild Nights with Emily" directed by Madeleine Olnek

Programmer Awards 
Features Programmer's Award ($500) --"Man on Fire" directed by Joel Fendelman

Shorts Programmer's Award ($250) --"Woke" directed by Kimberly Aleah

SHOUT Programmer's Award --"Matter and Manner" directed by Nigel Defriez

Best Life & Liberty Film ($250) --"Youth Unstappable" directed by Slater Jewell-Kemker

Spirit of Sidewalk Award --Jailen Young of Wrestle

Screenplay Awards -Sidewrite Screenplay Competition 
Best Alabama Screenplay: “June Block Hero” written by Seth Kozak

Best Short Screenplay: “Cherry Glazed” written by Christine Sherwood

Best Feature Screenplay: “Indian Country” written by Troy Kelly

2019

Jury Awards

Audience Awards

Screenplay Awards -Sidewrite Screenplay Competition 
Best Alabama Screenplay: “The Last American Lynching” written by T Gordon Stanley & Jeremy J Ford

Best Short Screenplay: “Found Objects” written by Amy Bond

Best Feature Screenplay: “Daughters Lost in the Desert” written by A.M. Sanchez

References

Sidewalk Moving Picture Festival